In mineralogy, a pseudomorph is a mineral or mineral compound that appears in an atypical form (crystal system), resulting from a substitution process in which the appearance and dimensions remain constant, but the original mineral is replaced by another. The name literally means "false form".

Terminology for pseudomorphs is "replacer after original", as in brookite after rutile.

Substitution pseudomorph

An infiltration pseudomorph, or substitution pseudomorph is a pseudomorph in which one mineral or other material is replaced by another. The original shape of the mineral remains unchanged, but color, hardness, and other properties change to those of the replacing mineral.  An example of this process is the replacement of wood by silica (quartz or opal) to form petrified wood in which the substitution may be so perfect as to retain the original cellular structure of the wood.  An example of mineral-to-mineral substitution is replacement of aragonite twin crystals by native copper, as occurs at the Corocoro United Copper Mines of Coro Coro, Bolivia.

A variety of infiltration or substitution pseudomorphism is called alteration, in which only partial replacement occurs.  This happens typically when a mineral of one composition changes by chemical reaction to another of similar composition, retaining the original crystalline shape.  An example is a change from galena (lead sulfide) to anglesite (lead sulfate).  The resulting pseudomorph may contain an unaltered core of galena surrounded by anglesite that has the cubic crystal shape of galena.

Paramorph
A paramorph (also called allomorph) is a mineral changed on the molecular level only. It has the same chemical composition, but with a different structure. The mineral looks identical to the original, unaltered form. This occurs, as an example, in the aragonite to calcite change.

Epimorph and incrustation pseudomorph
An incrustation pseudomorph, also called epimorph, results from a process by which a mineral is coated by another and  the encased mineral dissolves. The encasing mineral remains intact, and retains the shape of the original mineral or material. Alternatively, another mineral may fill the space (the mold) previously occupied by some other mineral or material.

In other fields

Pseudomorphs are also common in paleontology. Fossils are often formed by pseudomorphic replacement of the remains by mineral matter. Examples include petrified wood and pyritized gastropod shells.

In biology, a pseudomorph is a cloud of mucus-rich ink released by many species of cephalopod. The name refers to the similarity in appearance between the cephalopod that released it and the cloud itself, in this context meaning literally "false body". This behaviour often allows the cephalopod to escape from predation unharmed, and is often performed as part of what is known as the blanch-ink-jet maneuver.

In philosophy, the concept of pseudomorphosis was used by the German philosopher Oswald Spengler to describe how the forms of an older, more widely dispersed culture condition the expression forms of a younger, emerging culture, leading the latter to develop into forms that are fundamentally alien to its own world-feeling, and thereby preventing it from fully developing its own self-consciousness.

In archaeology, organic pseudomorphs are impressions of organic material that can accumulate on the surface of metal artifacts as they corrode. They may occur when metal artifacts are buried in contact with organics under damp soil.

See also

 Polymorphism (materials science)

References

 Dana's Manual of Mineralogy by Cornelis S. Hurlbut, Eighteenth Edition (1971, John Wiley & Sons, Inc.) 

Mineralogy